NA-25 Charsadda-II is a constituency for the National Assembly of Pakistan. The constituency was formerly known as NA-7 (Charsadda-I) from 1977 to 2018.

Members of Parliament

1977–2002: NA-7 Charsadda-I

2002–2018: NA-6 Charsadda-I

2018-2022: NA-24 Charsadda-II

Elections Since 2002

2002 general election

A total of 2,099 votes were rejected.

2008 general election

A total of 2,212 votes were rejected.

2013 general election

A total of 5,113 votes were rejected.

2018 general election 

General elections were held on 25 July 2018.

2022 by-election 
A by-election was held on 16 October 2022 due to the resignation of Fazal Muhammad Khan, the previous MNA from this seat.

†JI previously contested as part of MMA. JUI-F, who also previously contested as part of MMA, did not contest this election.

2023 by-election 
A by-election will be held on 30 April 2023 due to the vacation of this seat by Imran Khan, who won it in the 2022 by-election.

See also
NA-24 Charsadda-I
NA-26 Mohmand

References

External links 
 Election result's official website

24
24